United Nations Security Council Resolution 1585, adopted unanimously on 10 March 2005, after recalling resolutions 1547 (2004), 1556 (2004) and 1574 (2004) on the situation in Sudan, the Council extended the mandate of the United Nations Advance Mission in Sudan (UNAMIS) for a period of one week.

The mandate was extended until 17 March 2005, to allow for further discussions by the Security Council on the issue. Within two weeks, the United Nations Mission in Sudan would be established.

See also
 African Union Mission in Sudan
 United Nations–African Union Mission in Darfur
 International response to the War in Darfur
 List of United Nations Security Council Resolutions 1501 to 1600 (2003–2005)
 Southern Sudan
 United Nations Mission in Sudan
 War in Darfur

References

External links
 
Text of the Resolution at undocs.org

 1585
2005 in Sudan
 1585
March 2005 events